The Penobscot Marine Museum in Searsport, Maine, United States, is Maine's oldest maritime museum and is designed to preserve and educate people regarding Maine's and Searsport's rich and unique maritime and shipbuilding history. It was founded in 1936, and is located at 5 Church Street in the center of Searsport.

Description
The museum campus is composed of two sections.  The original heart of the campus is located on both sides of Church Street, and between Church and Reservoir Streets, just north of Main Street (United States Route 1).  In addition to these buildings, the museum has expanded into three attached buildings on the north side of Main Street west of Knox Bros. Ave.

Designed as a unique 19th century seafaring village, the museum encompasses thirteen historic and modern buildings, houses a modern exhibit gallery features annual shows and is home to a regionally important library and archives focused on maritime history and regional genealogy. Eight of the museum's buildings are on the National Register of Historic Places, five as part of a listing dedicated to the museum, and three as part of the Searsport Historic District. Among the collections is a significant photographic archives that includes glass plate negatives documenting life in New England and New York from 1909 and 1947 taken by the Eastern Illustrating & Publishing Company. The photographs are being digitized and made available online for research and access.

Campus buildings
Admission Center
Main Street Gallery
Savage Education Center
First Congregational Church of Searsport (active church on museum campus)
Captain Jeremiah Merithew House (mid-19th century sea captain's home)
Old Vestry
Douglas and Margaret Carver Memorial Gallery
Stephen Phillips Memorial Library
Old Town Hall (1845)
Duncan House
Duncan Boat Barn
Boat House
Yard in the Yard
Ross Carriage Barn
Fowler-True-Ross Barn
Fowler-True-Ross House (19th century)

See also
 List of maritime museums in the United States
 Penobscot Bay
 Sears Island
 National Register of Historic Places listings in Waldo County, Maine

References

External links

 Penobscot Marine Museum - official site

Maritime museums in Maine
Historic districts on the National Register of Historic Places in Maine
Museums in Waldo County, Maine
Open-air museums in Maine
Libraries on the National Register of Historic Places in Maine
Searsport, Maine
National Register of Historic Places in Waldo County, Maine